Boys Union Club is an association football club from Nepal. They play at 25,000 capacity Dasarath Rangasala Stadium. The club is a one-time Martyr's Memorial A-Division League champion, having won the title in 1975.

League finishes
The season-by-season performance of Boys Union Club since 2000:

Honours

National 

 Martyr's Memorial A-Division League:
 Champions: 1975

 Martyr's Memorial B-Division League:
 Champions: 2013

External links
 The team page at Goal Nepal

Football clubs in Nepal

References